Valdivia gayana is the sole accepted species in the genus Valdivia, a monotypic genus of flowering plant in the Escalloniaceae family. It is a subshrub with dry fruits that are indehiscent (they do not open). Its native distribution includes only three known localities in the Valdivia Province in Chile, South America.

References

External links
 Chile Bosque, photos of the plant
 Enciclopedia de la Flora Chilena has photos

Escalloniaceae
Flora of southern Chile